Kimball is an unincorporated community in Neosho County, Kansas, United States.  The community is located next to a railroad between cities of Erie and Stark.

History
Kimball, originally spelled Kimbal, was platted in 1888.

The first post office in Kimbal was established in May 1888. The name was officially changed to Kimball (with two Ls) in 1950, and the post office closed in 1956. 

The Missouri-Kansas-Texas Railroad passed through Kimball and a passenger depot previously existed in the community too.

References

Further reading

External links
 Neosho County maps: Current, Historic, KDOT

Unincorporated communities in Neosho County, Kansas
Unincorporated communities in Kansas